Kadhalikka Vanga is a 1972 Indian Tamil language film produced and written by Tamilvanan, starring Jaishankar, Srikanth and Major Sundarrajan with Manorama, Kavitha, Vijaya Girija and Thengai Srinivasan in supporting roles. It was released on 25 February 1972.

Plot

Cast 
Jaishankar as Tamilarasu
Major Sundarrajan as Judo
Srikanth as Ramesh
Kavitha as Kaveri
Thengai Srinivasan
Manorama as Ganga
Vijaya Girija as Yamuna
Shabnam as Jasmine

Soundtrack 
The music was composed by Raghava Naidu and the lyrics were written by Veerapandian.

References

External links 

1970s Tamil-language films
1972 films
Films scored by J. V. Raghavulu
Indian black-and-white films